Charles Franklin Sprague (June 10, 1857 – January 30, 1902) was a U.S. Representative from Massachusetts, grandson of Peleg Sprague (1793–1880).

Biography
Born in Boston, Massachusetts, Sprague attended the public schools and was graduated from Harvard University in 1879. He studied law at the Harvard Law School and the Boston University and was admitted to the bar in Boston.

He married Mary Bryant Pratt in November 1891.

He served as member of the Boston Common Council in 1889 and 1890, and then in the Massachusetts House of Representatives in 1891 and 1892. He chaired the board of park commissioners of the city of Boston in 1893 and 1894, and served in the Massachusetts State Senate in 1895 and 1896. 

Sprague was elected as a Republican to the Fifty-fifth and Fifty-sixth Congresses (March 4, 1897 – March 3, 1901). He declined to be a candidate for renomination in 1900 to the Fifty-seventh Congress.

He died in the Butler Sanitarium in Providence, Rhode Island, on January 30, 1902, and was interred in Mount Auburn Cemetery, Watertown, Massachusetts.

References

External links

 

1857 births
1902 deaths
Republican Party members of the Massachusetts House of Representatives
Boston City Council members
Republican Party Massachusetts state senators
Burials at Mount Auburn Cemetery
Republican Party members of the United States House of Representatives from Massachusetts
19th-century American politicians
Harvard Law School alumni
Boston University School of Law alumni
Harvard College alumni